Hackås is a locality situated in Berg Municipality, Jämtland County, Sweden with 480 inhabitants in 2010.

Hackås Court District, or Hackås tingslag, was a district of Jämtland in Sweden. The provinces in Norrland were never divided into hundreds and instead the court district (tingslag) served as the basic division of rural areas.

References 

Populated places in Berg Municipality
Jämtland